The 2012 United States House of Representatives elections in Hawaii were held on Tuesday, November 6, 2012 to elect the two U.S. representatives from the state, one from each of the state's two congressional districts. The elections coincided with the elections of other federal and state offices, including a quadrennial presidential election and an election for the United States Senate. Primary elections were held on August 11, 2012.

Overview

District 1

Democrat Colleen Hanabusa, who was first elected to represent the 1st district in 2010, ran for re-election.

Democratic primary

Candidates

Nominee
Colleen Hanabusa, incumbent U.S. Representative

Eliminated in primary
Roy Wyttenbach II

Primary results

Republican primary
Former U.S. Representative Charles Djou, who represented the 1st district from May 2010 until January 2011, sought and received the Republican nomination to challenge Hanabusa again. He defeated C. Kaui Amsterdam and John Giuffre in the Republican primary.

Candidates

Nominee
Charles Djou, former U.S. Representative

Eliminated in primary
C. Kaui Amsterdam
John Giuffre

Primary results

General election

Endorsements

Results

District 2

Democrat Mazie Hirono, who has represented the 2nd district since 2007, announced in May 2011 that she would run for the U.S. Senate rather than for re-election to the House.

Democratic primary

Candidates

Nominee
 Tulsi Gabbard, Honolulu City Councilmember

Eliminated in primary
 Rafael "Del" del Castillo, attorney and patients' rights advocate 
 Mufi Hannemann, former Mayor of Honolulu  
 Esther Kia'aina, chief advocate for the Office of Hawaiian Affairs 
 Bob Marx, attorney 
 Miles Shiratori, financial advisor

Declined
Tammy Duckworth, Assistant Secretary for Public and Intergovernmental Affairs in the U.S. Department of Veterans Affairs and an unsuccessful candidate for the House of Representatives in Illinois in 2006
Josh Green, state senator 
Clayton Hee, state senator
Gary Hooser, director of the state Office of Environmental Quality Control and former state senator
Mazie Hirono, incumbent U.S. Representative

Campaign
Hannemann and Gabbard differed on the issue of same-sex marriage. Gabbard was opposed to the Defense of Marriage Act and to a proposed Hawaii state constitutional amendment that would define marriage as between a woman and a man, while Hannemann supported DOMA. Gabbard had previously opposed same-sex marriage, but during the primary campaign, promised to work to repeal DOMA and co-sponsor the Respect for Marriage act.  Voters initially doubted the sincerity of her new views on the issue.

Gabbard filed a 270-page complaint against Hannemann's spending, saying that his campaign broke campaign finance laws by failing to report 2012 travel and polling expenses and improperly dealt with Hanneman's salary from a tourism association.

Candidates Marx, Gabbard, and Kia'aina debated on June 5, and Marx, Gabbard, Kia'aina and Hannemann debated in early July.

Gabbard's ratings in the polls increased steadily and Hannemann's dropped throughout the primary campaign,; as of August 6, she was leading against Hanneman 49% to 29%.

Endorsements
Gabbard received endorsements from the Sierra Club, Women Under Forty PAC, Emily's List, VoteVets and MauiTime.

Primary results
On August 11, Gabbard defeated Hanneman by twenty points. The Honolulu Star-Advertiser described her win as the "improbable rise from a distant underdog to victory".  Gabbard credited grassroots support as the reason for her come-from-behind win in the primary.

Aftermath
Gabbard decided to resign her seat on the City Council, stating that she wanted to prevent the cost of a separate special election, and resigned on August 16.

Republican primary

Candidates

Nominee
 Kawika Crowley, handyman

Eliminated in primary
 Matthew DiGeronimo, entrepreneur, motivational and business speaker, radio talk show host and former Navy officer

Declined
Duke Aiona, former Lieutenant Governor of Hawaii
Jonah Kaauwai, the former chairman of the Hawaii Republican Party,

Primary results

General election

Endorsements

Results

References

External links
State of Hawaii, Office of Elections official site
Primary election results
United States House of Representatives elections in Hawaii, 2012 at Ballotpedia
Hawaii U.S. House at OurCampaigns.com
Campaign contributions for U.S. Congressional races in Hawaii at OpenSecrets
Outside spending at the Sunlight Foundation

Hawaii
2012
United StatesHouse of Representatives